Hoeata is a surname. Notable people with the surname include:

Fin Hoeata (born 1996), New Zealand rugby union player
Jarrad Hoeata (born 1983), New Zealand rugby union player
Riki Hoeata (born 1988), New Zealand rugby union player